The 2002–03 UEFA Champions League was the 11th season of UEFA's premier European club football tournament, the UEFA Champions League, since its rebranding in 1992, and the 48th European Cup tournament overall. The competition was won by Milan, who beat Juventus on penalties in the European Cup's first ever all-Italian final, to win their sixth European title, and its first in nine years. Manchester United's Ruud van Nistelrooy was again the top scorer, scoring 12 goals over the two group stages and knockout stage, in addition to two goals he had scored in the qualifying phase, although his side bowed out in the quarter-finals and missed out on the chance of playing in a final at their own stadium.

Real Madrid were the defending champions, but were eliminated by Juventus in the semi-finals.

Association team allocation
A total of 72 teams participated in the 2002–03 Champions League, from 48 of 52 UEFA associations (Liechtenstein organises no domestic league competition). Two lowest-ranked associations (Andorra and San Marino) were not admitted. Additionally, no teams Azerbaijan were admitted this year as no official champion was decided in 2001–02 season.

Below is the qualification scheme for the 2002–03 UEFA Champions League:
Associations 1–3 each have four teams qualify
Associations 4–6 each have three teams qualify
Associations 7–15 each have two teams qualify
Associations 16–52 each have one team qualify (except Liechtenstein, San Marino, Andorra and Azerbaijan)

Association ranking
Countries are allocated places according to their 2001 UEFA league coefficient, which takes into account their performance in European competitions from 1996–97 to 2000–01.

Distribution
Since the title holders (Real Madrid) also qualified for the Champions League Third qualifying round through their domestic league, one Third qualifying round spot was vacated. Due to this, as well as due to suspension of Azerbaijan, the following changes to the default access list are made:
The champions of association 16 (Scotland) are promoted from the second qualifying round to the third qualifying round.
The champions of associations 26, 27 and 28 (Israel, Slovenia and Bulgaria) are promoted from the first qualifying round to the second qualifying round.

Teams
League positions of the previous season shown in parentheses (TH: Champions League title holders).

Notes

Round and draw dates
All draws held at UEFA headquarters in Nyon, Switzerland unless stated otherwise.

Qualifying rounds

First qualifying round

Second qualifying round

1Match played at GSP Stadium in Nicosia, Cyprus since UEFA banned international matches from being played in Israel.

Third qualifying round

1Match played in Sofia, Bulgaria after UEFA banned international matches from being played in Israel.

First group stage

16 winners from the third qualifying round, 10 champions from countries ranked 1–10, and six second-placed teams from countries ranked 1–6 were drawn into eight groups of four teams each. The top two teams in each group advance to the Champions League second group stage, while the third-placed teams advance to round three of the UEFA Cup.

Tiebreakers, if necessary, are applied in the following order:
Points earned in head-to-head matches between the tied teams.
Total goals scored in head-to-head matches between the tied teams.
Away goals scored in head-to-head matches between the tied teams.
Cumulative goal difference in all group matches.
Total goals scored in all group matches.
Higher UEFA coefficient going into the competition.

Basel, Genk and Maccabi Haifa made their debut in the group stage. Maccabi Haifa became the first Israeli club to qualify for the group stage.

Group A

Group B

Group C

Group D

Group E

Group F

Group G

Group H

Second group stage

The eight group winners and eight group runners-up were drawn into four groups, with each one containing two group winners and two group runners-up. The top two teams in each group advanced to the Champions League knockout stage.

Tiebreakers, if necessary, are applied in the following order:
Points earned in head-to-head matches between the tied teams.
Total goals scored in head-to-head matches between the tied teams.
Away goals scored in head-to-head matches between the tied teams.
Cumulative goal difference in all group matches.
Total goals scored in all group matches.
Higher UEFA coefficient going into the competition.

Group A

Group B

Group C

Group D

Knockout stage

Bracket

Quarter-finals

Semi-finals

*Both clubs played their home leg in the same stadium (the San Siro), but Milan were the designated away side in the second leg, and thus won on away goals.

Final

Statistics

Top goalscorers

Source: Top Scorers – Final – Wednesday 28 May 2003 (after matches) (accessed 6 November 2010)

Top assists

Source: Top Assists – Final – Wednesday 28 May 2003 (after matches) (accessed 2 September 2014)

See also
2002–03 UEFA Cup
2003 Intercontinental Cup
2003 UEFA Super Cup
2002 UEFA Intertoto Cup
2002–03 UEFA Women's Cup

References

External links

 2002–03 All matches – season at UEFA website
 2002–03 season at UEFA website
 European Cup results at Rec.Sport.Soccer Statistics Foundation
 All scorers 2002–03 UEFA Champions League (excluding qualifying round) according to protocols UEFA + all scorers qualifying round
 2002/03 UEFA Champions League - results and line-ups (archive)
 

 
1
UEFA Champions League seasons